Mycterus quadricollis is a species of palm or flower beetle in the family Mycteridae.  It is found in North America.

References

Further reading

 
 
 

Tenebrionoidea
Beetles described in 1874